Kaiparathina is a genus of sea snails, marine gastropod mollusks in the subfamily Kaiparathininae of the  family Trochidae.

Species
Species within the genus Kaiparathina include:
 Kaiparathina boucheti Marshall, 1993
 Kaiparathina coriolis Marshall, 1993
 Kaiparathina daedala Marshall, 1993
 Kaiparathina fasciata Marshall, 1993
 † Kaiparathina praecellens Laws, 1941 
 † Kaiparathina senex B. A. Marshall, 1995 
 Kaiparathina vaubani Marshall, 1993
Species brought into synonymy
 † Kaiparathina navakaensis (Ladd, 1982): synonym of Ilanga navakaensis (Ladd, 1982)

References

External links
 To World Register of Marine Species
 Laws, C.R. (1941) The molluscan faunule at Pakaurangi Point, Kaipara. No. 2. Transactions of the Royal Society of New Zealand, 71, 134-151, pls. 16-19
  Marshall B.A. (1993) A review of the genus Kaiparathina Laws, 1941 (Mollusca: Gastropoda: Trochoidea). The Veliger 36: 185-198

 
Trochidae